Brad Wira (born 16 March 1972) was an Australian rules footballer. He played for both the Fremantle Football Club and the Western Bulldogs.  He was originally drafted from Claremont in the WAFL as a foundation selection as part of Fremantle's entry to the AFL and played mainly as a defender.

After only playing a single game in Fremantle's inaugural year, Wira was traded to Footscray where he was much more successful, playing in 21 of the 22 rounds in 1996.  He would play a further 40 games for the Bulldogs over the next two seasons, before he was traded back to Fremantle for the 1999 season.

External links

1972 births
Fremantle Football Club players
Claremont Football Club players
Western Bulldogs players
Living people
Australian rules footballers from Western Australia
Western Australian State of Origin players